Bibhusita Das is an Indian marine engineer. She is first Odia woman to become a marine engineer. Das is the first woman from Odisha to serve as an officer on a shipping vessel.
As the only woman in an otherwise all-male crew she has defied social pressure and set aside societal conventions to do so.

Early life and education
Bibhusita Das was born and brought up in Cuttack, Odisha. Her father Kurunakar Das is a retired Bharat Sanchar Nigam Limited (BSNL) employee. The youngest of four sisters, she credits her parents for their support and encouragement.

Das completed a four-year Bachelor of Technology (B. Tech.) at C. V. Raman College of Engineering, Bhubaneshwar, Odisha in 2007. She was the only one of the 7 girls in her engineering group to opt for on-board sailing.

Career 
After working as a lecturer in Tirunelveli for six months, she was hired by the Shipping Corporation of India and opted for an on-board position.
  
In 2012, she was promoted to third engineer at the Shipping Corporation of India. In 2013, as the Marine Engineer of the cargo ship MV Biswamahal, Bibhusita Das was felicitated by the Port Trust, after the ship arrived in Paradip port en route from Australia.

Her work can involve hard physical labor managing the ship's machinery. Voyages can last up to six months at a time. Her job has enabled her to travel to many countries including Australia, South Africa, Turkey, Britain, and Germany.

Personal life 
 she lived at Koel Nagar, Rourkela.

See also 
 Women in engineering
 Marine engineering
 Kiran Bedi
 Seema Rao
 Punita Arora

References 

21st-century Indian women
21st-century Indian people
Living people
Marine engineers
Indian women engineers
21st-century women engineers
People from Cuttack
Women from Odisha
Year of birth missing (living people)